

In Morocco 
 Garrab: a person who practices Tagarrabt

Locations 
Garab or Gar Ab or Garrab may refer to:
 Gar Ab, Alborz
 Garab, Chaharmahal and Bakhtiari
 Gar Ab, Hormozgan
 Garab, Ilam
 Garab, alternate name of Pagal-e Garab, Ilam Province
 Garab Khvoshadul, Ilam Province
 Garrab-e Olya, Kermanshah
 Garab, Khuzestan
 Garab, Behbahan, Khuzestan Province
 Garab, Kohgiluyeh and Boyer-Ahmad
 Garab Dishmuk, Kohgiluyeh and Boyer-Ahmad Province
 Garab, Lorestan
 Garab, Khorramabad, Lorestan Province
 Garab Kuchek, Lorestan Province 
 Garab, Mashhad, Razavi Khorasan Province
 Garab, Nishapur, Razavi Khorasan Province
 Garab, Sabzevar, Razavi Khorasan Province
 Garáb, village in Hungary

See also
 Garab-e Olya (disambiguation)
 Gurab (disambiguation)